The Michigan Wolverines women's lacrosse team is the intercollegiate women's lacrosse program representing the University of Michigan. The school competes in the Big Ten Conference in Division I of the National Collegiate Athletic Association (NCAA). The Wolverines play their home games in Ann Arbor, primarily at Michigan Stadium with the indoor Oosterbaan Field House as a secondary option. Women's lacrosse was established as a varsity sport in 2014, and the team played in the American Lacrosse Conference during its inaugural season before joining the Big Ten in 2015. The team is currently coached by Hannah Nielsen.

History 

Prior to the establishment of its varsity program, women's lacrosse was a club sport at the University of Michigan. In 2011, the club team compiled a record of 15–6 under the direction of head coach Jen Dunbar. On May 25, 2011, Michigan officially promoted its women's lacrosse team to varsity status, the same day that the school's varsity men's program was announced. Unlike the men's team, the women's team was not originally scheduled to begin play until 2013. In May 2011, the most pressing priorities for the new women's program were the search for its first head coach and its application for membership in the American Lacrosse Conference, which counted among its members other Big Ten schools such as Northwestern, Ohio State, and Penn State, as well as more distant institutions such as Florida, Johns Hopkins, and Vanderbilt.

In 2014, Michigan played its inaugural varsity season as a member of the American Lacrosse Conference under head coach Jennifer Ulehla. Prior to being named head coach on September 8, 2011, Uleha had been an assistant coach at Florida and with the U.S. National Elite Team as well as an assistant coach at Temple and James Madison. The program's first official varsity game was at Villanova on February 22, while its home opener was against Marquette on February 28 at Oosterbaan Field House. On June 3, 2013, the Big Ten Conference announced that it would begin sponsoring women's lacrosse in 2015; together with men's lacrosse, which would debut the same season, they would respectively be the conference's 27th and 28th official sports. Alongside Michigan, the five other teams competing in the new conference included Maryland, Northwestern, Ohio State, Penn State, and Rutgers. As of 2015, head coach Uleha's coaching staff consists of assistant coaches Becca Block and Alyssa Murray.

Coaching staff

Season results
The following is a list of Michigan's season results as an NCAA Division I program:

{| class="wikitable"

|- align="center"

†NCAA canceled 2020 collegiate activities due to the COVID-19 virus.

Stadium 

Michigan plays its home games at both Michigan Stadium and Oosterbaan Field House. For both the 2014 and 2015 seasons, the team scheduled its first two games of the year at Oosterbaan, and then played the remainder of its home schedule (six games, in both cases) at Michigan Stadium. Oosterbaan Field House, which was built in 1970, has a total capacity of 1,000 and a FieldTurf playing surface. Michigan Stadium boasts a capacity of 107,601 and was built for the Michigan football team in 1927; however, it did not host a varsity lacrosse game until 2012, when the Michigan men's lacrosse program played its first game there. The women's team played its first game at Michigan Stadium on March 20, 2014, losing to Winthrop, 14–12.

References

External links 

 

 
College women's lacrosse teams in the United States
Lacrosse teams in Michigan
2014 establishments in Michigan
Lacrosse clubs established in 2014
Women's sports in Michigan